Blessing Enyindah is the Anglican Bishop of Ikwerre in Niger Delta Province of the Church of Nigeria.

He was elected in 2007 as the first Bishop of Ikwerre.

References 

Living people
Anglican bishops of Ikwerre
21st-century Anglican bishops in Nigeria
Nigerian Anglicans
Year of birth missing (living people)